Totomachapan Zapotec (Western Zimatlán Zapotec) is a Zapotec language of Oaxaca, Mexico. There is no mutual intelligibility with other Zapotec languages.

References

Zapotec languages